Lissajous may refer to

 Jules Antoine Lissajous (1822–1880), French mathematician
 Lissajous curve (or figure, or spiral), a mathematical figure showing a type of harmonic motion
 Lissajous knot, in knot theory
 Lissajous orbit, an orbital trajectory resembling a Lissajous curve